The 55th running of Liège–Bastogne–Liège classic cycling race in Belgium was held on 22 April 1969. Eddy Merckx won the race, his first of five victories in the monument classic.

Summary
Five riders were in an early breakaway, two of which were teammates of Eddy Merckx, the young Belgian who had already won every major classic in the spring of 1969, apart from Paris–Roubaix. At 98 km from the finish, Merckx broke clear from the pack on the Stockeu and combined with his two teammates Roger Swerts and Vic Van Schil in the front of the race. Swerts was dropped, and Merckx and Van Schil powered on to Liège, with Merckx doing most of the work. Merckx wanted to give the victory to his teammate, but Van Schil insisted Merckx should win. Britain's Barry Hoban won the sprint for third place, trailing eight minutes behind Merckx and Van Schil.

Results

References

1969
1969 in road cycling
1969 in Belgian sport
1969 Super Prestige Pernod